Susan D. Richardson is the Arthur Sease Williams Professor of Chemistry at the University of South Carolina. Richardson's research primarily focuses on emerging environmental contaminants, particularly those affecting drinking water systems and including disinfection by-products (DBPs) that can occur in water purification systems.

Education 
She earned her bachelor's degree in Chemistry and Mathematics at Georgia College & State University. Additionally, she completed her Ph.D. in chemistry at Emory University, under the direction of Fred Menger. She received an Honorary Doctorate from Cape Breton University.

Career and awards 
Prior to joining the faculty at University of South Carolina, Richardson worked at the National Exposure Research Laboratory of U.S. Environmental Protection Agency for 25 years, first as a postdoctoral fellow and then a research chemist.

Richardson has been the recipient of numerous awards, including (among others): Fellow of the American Chemical Society (2016); Fellow of the American Association for the Advancement of Sciences (2019); the Herty Medal (2020).

Richardson served on a number of board positions with the American Society for Mass Spectrometry: Treasurer (2002-2004), Vice President for Programs (2018-2020), and President (2020-2022).

References 

American women chemists
Living people
Year of birth missing (living people)
Georgia College & State University alumni
Emory University alumni
University of South Carolina faculty
21st-century American chemists
Mass spectrometrists
21st-century American women scientists